Macrarene spectabilospina is a species of sea snail, a marine gastropod mollusk in the family Liotiidae.

References

 Donald R. Shasky, New Gastropod Taxa from Tropical West America; The Veliger v. 13 (1970-1971)

External links
 To Biodiversity Heritage Library (1 publication)
 To World Register of Marine Species

spectabilospina
Gastropods described in 1970